Honghe Subdistrict is a subdistrict in Yuanjiang Hani, Yi and Dai Autonomous County, Yunnan, China. It is the political, economic and cultural center of Yuanjiang Hani and Yi Autonomous County.

Administrative division
As of 2016, the subdistrict is divided into five villages: 
 Honghe Community
 Fenghuang Community
 Xingyuan Community
 Dashuiping Community
 Qiaotou Community

History
In August 2011, it was upgraded to a town. It formerly known as "Lijiang Town".

Geography
It lies at the central of Yuanjiang Hani, Yi and Dai Autonomous County, bordering Manlai Town to the northwest, Lijiang Subdistrict to the south, Ganzhuang Subdistrict to the northeast, and Mili Township to the southeast.

The Yuan River winds through the subdistrict.

Economy
The region's economy is based on agriculture, industry, and commerce.

Transportation
The subdistrict is connected to two highways: the National Highway G553 and G213.

References

Bibliography

Divisions of Yuanjiang Hani, Yi and Dai Autonomous County